Dmitry Tursunov claimed the title, defeating Andreas Beck 6–4, 6–4 in the final.

Seeds

Draw

Finals

Top half

Bottom half

References
 Main Draw
 Qualifying Draw

Aegon GB Pro-Series Bath - Singles
2011 Men's Singles